Tonnerre River (Thunder River) may refer to:

 Tonnerre River (Minganie), a river in the Côte-Nord region of Quebec, Canada
 Tonnerre River (Normandin River), a tributary of the Normandin River, in Le Domaine-du-Roy, Quebec, Canada